Arhopala lata, is a butterfly in the family Lycaenidae. It was described by William Harry Evans in 1957. It is found in the Australasian realm where it is endemic to Halmahera.

References

External links
Arhopala Boisduval, 1832 at Markku Savela's Lepidoptera and Some Other Life Forms. Retrieved June 3, 2017.

Arhopala
Butterflies described in 1957